Ghosts&Phantoms is a vinyl LP in limited edition from the Swedish rock band Mando Diao. In December 2011, 24 unpublished songs have been released as the band's Christmas calendar for download. Due to the immediate success, an LP was released in January, 2012, as limited edition of 500 pieces, containing 22 songs, and for free download.

Track listing

Side A

Side B

Side C

Side D

References

2012 albums
Mando Diao albums